Belfor is a multinational corporation that sells recovery and restoration services, for the purpose of restoring structures damaged as a result of fires, floods, and natural disasters.

Ownership history 
Belfor begins as Quality Awnings & Construction in Dearborn, Michigan in 1946. The company changed its name to Inrecon L.L.C. (for Insurance Reconstruction) in 1981. Taylor, Michigan-based Masco bought 25 percent of the company in 1997, and completed its purchase of Inrecon in 1999.

Haniel EnviroServices, a new division of the old European conglomerate Haniel, begins in Germany in 1980. Its name is changed to Belfor in 1998.

Masco sold Inrecon to Haniel in 2001 and Inrecon became part of Belfor. At the time Inrecon had annual sales of $180 million and employed 1,000 staff.

As of February 2019, Belfor Holdings Inc. was in discussions regarding a potential sale to the American Securities equity firm. These were concluded successfully in April 2019.

United States operations
Belfor USA Group Inc, doing business as Belfor Property Restoration, is based in Birmingham, Michigan, and provides integrated disaster recovery and property restoration services. Belfor USA Group Inc. operates as a subsidiary of Belfor Europe GmbH.

In 2007 Belfor USA acquired Ductz International, LLC, an air duct cleaning and HVAC restoration franchise network with locations in 22 states. It acquired Hawaii Restorative Services of Honolulu and Coach's Catastrophe in 2010. Belfor acquired BAMCOR in 2015.

Belfor opened an office in Corpus Christi, Texas, and a San Antonio office in 2016. As of that year, Belfor globally had 7000 employees.

Projects
In 2003, the Canadian branch of Belfor worked to recover 100,000 books and manuscripts in the 17th-century Khan Collection at the Urdu Research Library of the Sundarayya Vignana Kendram, as a result of flood damage following record rains in Hyderabad in August 2000. The company was employed in Houston after Tropical Storm Allison in 2001, which caused damage to Jones Hall, the Wortham Theater Center and the Alley Theater, with the loss of musical scores, ballet costumes and musical instruments, including three Steinway concert grand pianos.

In 2004, after Hurricane Ivan, Belfor (UK) and Belfor (Canada) performed thermal vacuum freeze drying to restore more than 4,000 boxes of documents, half of the vital records in the Cayman Islands National Archives. After Hurricane Katrina in 2005, Belfor helped fulfil Tulane's campus-wide emergency plan, which included the “Landmark Undertaking” of the Tulane Libraries Recovery Center.

Other projects included recovery from the Chile earthquake and the 2012 Super Storm Sandy.

Awards 
2012, RIA Phoenix Award; BELFOR Rebuilds UGI Headquarters
2013, Chrysalis Award, Residential Insurance Restoration; BELFOR helps family redesign their home after a devastating fire
2015, Chrysalis Award, Commercial Insurance Restoration; Restores Gallo Center for the Arts after a water damage
2016, Chrysalis National Award -Commercial Insurance Restoration; Restoring the historic Hanford Fox Theatre
2016, RIA Phoenix Award, Odessa Hospital; Award for innovations in restoration

References

External links 
 
 CNBC - BELFOR CEO: Sandy Clean-Up 
 CBS MoneyWatch - How BELFOR Grew To Be #1 In Disaster Recovery
 Celebrating Our Economy - Sheldon Yellen has built a reputation for his unconventional management style.

Privately held companies of the United States
Business services companies established in 1946
Cleaning companies of the United States
Companies based in Oakland County, Michigan
1946 establishments in Michigan